Cronkite is a surname. Notable people with the surname include:
 Walter Cronkite (1916–2009), American broadcast journalist and anchorman
 Kathy Cronkite (born 1950), American actress and mental health worker, daughter of Walter Cronkite
 James Kipton Cronkite (born 1971), American entrepreneur and philanthropist

See also
Cronkhite, a surname of Dutch origin
6318 Cronkite, Mars-crossing asteroid

Surnames of Dutch origin
Americanized surnames